CHRC was a French language Canadian radio station located in Quebec City, Quebec. Known as Québec 800, the station had a news/talk/sports format. Founded in 1926, it was the oldest station in Quebec City at the time of its shutdown.

The station's studios were located at Colisée Pepsi in Quebec City.

It was previously part of the Radiomédia/Corus Québec network, which operated across Quebec.

On August 9, 2007, Corus announced a deal to sell the station to a group of local businessmen, namely Michel Cadrin, Jacques Tanguay and Patrick Roy, owners of the Remparts. The new owners plan on converting the station to a primarily sports-based format. This application was approved by the CRTC on June 26, 2008.

CHRC's alumni include former Premier of Quebec René Lévesque, who was a substitute announcer for CHRC during 1941 and 1942.

CHRC announced it would cease operations at the end of the month of September 2012, at the same time discontinuing the last AM radio service from Quebec City. Sports broadcast rights would soon be transferred to CJMF-FM. CHRC fell silent late in the evening of September 30, 2012. Before leaving the air at 6:06 p.m., the station's final words broadcast were farewell messages from their staff. Parties interested in acquiring 800 included the Tietolman-Tétrault-Pancholy Media group and Bell Media Radio, though no deals were made since the station's closure.

CHRC's programming and document archives were since donated to the Bibliothèque et Archives nationales du Québec.

The CHRC callsign would later be reassigned to a new FM station in Clarence-Rockland, Ontario, as CHRC-FM.

References

External links

Hrc
Hrc
Hrc
Quebec Remparts
HRC
Radio stations established in 1926
Radio stations disestablished in 2012
1926 establishments in Quebec
2012 disestablishments in Quebec
HRC (AM)